Melisa Paola Gretter (born 24 January 1993) is an Argentine basketball player for Campinas Basquete Clube and the Argentina women's national basketball team.

She defended Argentina at the 2018 FIBA Women's Basketball World Cup.

References

External links

1993 births
Living people
Argentine expatriate basketball people in Spain
Argentine expatriate sportspeople in Brazil
Argentine women's basketball players
Basketball players at the 2019 Pan American Games
Pan American Games 3x3 basketball players
Point guards
Sportspeople from Santa Fe, Argentina
Pan American Games medalists in basketball
Pan American Games silver medalists for Argentina
Medalists at the 2019 Pan American Games